Vallecito may refer to:

Places
In the United States
 Vallecito, California, in Calaveras County
 Vallecito, San Diego County, California
 Vallecito Mountains, San Diego County, California
 Vallecito, Colorado
 Vallecito Dam, Colorado

Elsewhere
 , Argentina
 El Vallecito, an archaeological site in La Rumorosa, Baja California, Mexico

See also
 Vallecito Creek (disambiguation)
 Vallecitos (disambiguation)